Ilya Salmanzadeh (born 19 September 1986 in Stockholm), known mononymously as ILYA, is a Swedish-Persian songwriter, producer and singer. He rose to prominence outside of Sweden after co-writing and producing Ariana Grande's "Problem" and Jennifer Lopez's "First Love".

Career
In 2005 at the age of 19, Ilya signed with Warner/Chappell Music in Stockholm, Sweden. In 2009, he graduated from the Musicians Institute in Hollywood, California. "Miss Me", Mohombi & Nelly's song in 2010, was Ilya's first internationally acclaimed production. In 2011, he produced "Mama" and "Reba" from The Lonely Island's Grammy-nominated album, Turtleneck & Chain. In 2013, he produced Cher Lloyd's song, "I Wish", and Fifth Harmony's award-winning song, "Me & My Girls".

Alongside Max Martin, he co-wrote and produced Ariana Grande's "Problem" and Jennifer Lopez's "First Love" in 2014. "Problem" went on to become one of the fastest-selling singles in iTunes history before winning a Teen Choice Award, VMA and EMA months later. In June 2014, Ilya was nominated for the Denniz Pop Awards, an annual prize handed out to up-and-coming musicians. "Bang Bang", co-produced by Ilya, was released as a joint single by Jessie J, Ariana Grande and Nicki Minaj on 29 July 2014 to universal acclaim. In January 2015, Ellie Goulding's "Love Me Like You Do", co-written by Ilya, was released for the soundtrack album to the motion picture, Fifty Shades of Grey, becoming the most-streamed song in a week on Spotify. In May 2015, he remixed Taylor Swift's "Bad Blood" with Kendrick Lamar, which became his first No.1 on the Billboard Hot 100.

He co-wrote and produced large parts of Ariana Grande's later albums Sweetener and Thank U, Next. In 2019, Salmanzadeh co-wrote and produced Beyoncé's Grammy-nominated song "Spirit". He also worked on the production of Labrinth's singles "Miracle" and "Oblivion" (which features Sia), both taken from his sophomore solo album, Imagination & the Misfit Kid.

Discography

Singles
As lead artist
2007: "Used To Be"
As featured artist
2009: "Get You on the Pool" (Kocky & Trash featuring Ilya)
2011: "Got It Like That" (Lazee ft. Ilya)

Production discography
Ilya's works include:

Awards and nominations

See also
 Persian Swedes
 List of songs recorded by Jennifer Lopez

References

External links
 
 
 
 

1986 births
Living people
English-language singers from Sweden
Musicians Institute alumni
People from Kerman
Singers from Stockholm
Swedish agnostics
Swedish audio engineers
Swedish composers
Swedish male composers
Swedish dance musicians
Swedish expatriates in the United States
Swedish hip hop musicians
Swedish keyboardists
Swedish people of Iranian descent
Swedish pop guitarists
Swedish pop pianists
Swedish pop singers
Swedish record producers
Swedish rhythm and blues musicians
Swedish singer-songwriters
Universal Music Group artists
Warner Music Group artists
21st-century Swedish engineers
Male pianists
21st-century Swedish singers
21st-century pianists
21st-century guitarists
21st-century Swedish male singers
Musikförläggarnas pris winners